Barbara Thompson may refer to:

Barbara J. Thompson (born 1969), American heliophysicist and expert on the causes of space weather
Barbara Thompson (figure skater), British figure skater who competed in ice dance
Barbara Thompson (musician) (1944–2022), English jazz saxophonist, flutist and composer
Barbara Thompson (castaway) (1831–1916), only survivor of the shipwrecked cutter America
Barbara Thompson (politician) (1924–2010), Wisconsin Superintendent of Public Instruction
Barbara Thompson (baseball) (1932–2020), All-American Girls Professional Baseball League player for Rockford Peaches